Plastic Surgery (formerly Canadian Journal of Plastic Surgery) is a peer-reviewed medical journal dealing with plastic surgery. It is the official journal of several national Canadian societies: the Canadian Society of Plastic Surgeons, the Canadian Society for Aesthetic (Cosmetic) Plastic Surgery, the  Groupe pour l'Avancement de la Microchirurgie Canada, and the Canadian Society for Surgery of the Hand (Manus Canada). The journal covers both research and material dealing with continuing medical education and society guidelines. It was published by the Pulsus Group, which was placed on Jeffrey Beall's list of "Potential, possible, or probable" predatory open-access publishers following its sale to OMICS Publishing Group. The journal subsequently switched publishers and is now published by SAGE Publications.

Abstracting and indexing
The journal is abstracted and indexed in EBSCO databases and the Science Citation Index Expanded. According to the Journal Citation Reports, the journal has a 2020 impact factor of 0.947.

References

External links

Multilingual journals
Surgery journals
Quarterly journals
Publications established in 1993
SAGE Publishing academic journals
Academic journals associated with learned and professional societies of Canada